José Javier Hombrados (born 7 April 1972) is a Spanish former handball player for Spain national team.

Trophies
 Liga ASOBAL: 4
 1994, 2002, 2004 and 2007
 EHF Champion's League: 4
 1994, 2001, 2006 and 2008
 EHF Cup Winner's Cup: 2
 1999 and 2003
 Copa del Rey: 4
 1996, 2002, 2003 and 2008
 Copa ASOBAL: 6
 1998, 1999, 2004, 2005, 2006 and 2007
 Handball World Championship: 1
 2005
 Handball European Championship: 1
 1996
 European Super Cup: 3
 2001, 2006 and 2007
 Spanish Super Cup: 2
 2005 and 2008

References

External links
 Profile

1972 births
Living people
Spanish male handball players
Liga ASOBAL players
Handball players at the 1996 Summer Olympics
Handball players at the 2004 Summer Olympics
Handball players at the 2008 Summer Olympics
Handball players at the 2012 Summer Olympics
Olympic handball players of Spain
Olympic bronze medalists for Spain
BM Ciudad Real players
SDC San Antonio players
HSG Wetzlar players
CB Ademar León players
Olympic medalists in handball
Medalists at the 2008 Summer Olympics